The Benedicta Arts Center (BAC) is a performing arts center located on the campus of the College of Saint Benedict. Built in 1964 by the Sisters of the Order of Saint Benedict in the city of St. Joseph, MN, the Benedicta Arts Center has remained a powerhouse for the arts in Central Minnesota.

The BAC presents three annual performances by the Minnesota Orchestra and has recently commissioned works by Diavolo and Merce Cunningham Dance Company

The BAC houses the Theater Department, and half of the music and art departments for the College of Saint Benedict/Saint John's University. The building also houses 2 art galleries, a music library and 6 class rooms. The BAC also houses the Arlene Helgeson Dance Studio, the Darnell Amphitheater, the Gold'n'Plump Office Suite, and the Book Arts Studio.

Escher Auditorium

Escher Auditorium functions as both a concert performance hall as well as a 974-seat theater. The back wall of the theater can be raised to reveal a traditional theatrical stage house which is used for dance companies and concerts. The auditorium has 2 balcony levels above the main floor that seat about 100 audience members each. The main stage is equipped with a pair of hydraulic lifts that can also be lowered to pit or house level, allowing space for either an orchestra or additional audience members.  The auditorium was previously named Petters Auditorium after Tom Petters gave a large donation for a renovation of the auditorium.  After Petters' conviction of running a ponzi scheme in 2009, the College decided to rename the auditorium.

Gorecki Family Theater
The Gorecki Theater shares its stage house with the Escher Auditorium, making it one of the few theaters in the country with this unique design.  The space hosts performances of the  CSB/SJU theater department in addition to lectures and other performances requiring a smaller venue. It seats 292 patrons and, thanks to a hydraulic elevator and seating system, is capable of featuring both Proscenium and Thrust performances.

Notable Performers
These Performers have appeared on either the Gorecki Stage or in the Escher Auditorium

 Kathy Mattea
 Merce Cunningham Dance Company (2007, 2005,...)
 Diavolo Dance Company (2006, 2003)
 The Samul Nori Korean Drummers (2003)
 Trinity Irish Dance Company (2003)
 Preservation Hall Jazz Band (2007)
 Kronos Quartet (2006)
 In the Heart of the Beast Puppet and Mask Theater (2006)
 Michael Moschen 2006
 Dianne Reeves 2006
 Mark Morris Dance Group (2005)
 Luna Negra Dance Theater (2006) 
 Kronos Quartet (2006) 
 Ladysmith Black Mambazo (2007)
 Cherish the Ladies (2007)
 Ron K. Brown/EVIDENCE (2008)
 The Seán Curran Company(2008)
 Edgar Meyer (2008)
 Urban Bush Women (2008)
 Ricky Skaggs & Kentucky Thunder (2011)
 Natalie MacMaster (2011)
 Spirit of Uganda (2012)
 Keb' Mo' (2012)
 Soweto Gospel Choir (2014)
 Cirque Alfonse: TIMBER! (2015)
 Bela Fleck & Abigail Washburn (2015)

Performing arts centers in Minnesota
College of Saint Benedict and Saint John's University
Tourist attractions in Stearns County, Minnesota